The 1994 Rutgers Scarlet Knights football team represented Rutgers University in the 1994 NCAA Division I-A football season. In their fifth season under head coach Doug Graber, the Scarlet Knights compiled a 5–5–1 record, were outscored by opponents 261 to 241, and finished in sixth place in the Big East Conference. The team's statistical leaders included Ray Lucas with 1,869 passing yards, Terrell Willis with 1,080 rushing yards, and Marco Battaglia with 779 receiving yards.

Schedule

Roster

References

Rutgers
Rutgers Scarlet Knights football seasons
Rutgers Scarlet Knights football